Ullyot is a surname. Notable people with the surname include:

Joan Ullyot (1940–2021), American runner and physician
Ronald Ullyot (born 1946), Canadian ice hockey player and coach
Ted Ullyot, American lawyer and government official